Holman may refer to:

People
 Holman (surname), including people with the name
 Holman (given name), a list of people with the name

Places

United States
 Holman, Missouri, a former town
 Holman, Texas, a settlement
 Holman, Washington, a stop on the Ilwaco Railway and Navigation Company's narrow gauge line
 Holman, West Virginia, an unincorporated community
 Holman Correctional Facility, a state prison near the city of Atmore, Alabama
 Holman Stadium (Nashua), New Hampshire
 Holman Stadium (Vero Beach), Florida
 St. Paul Downtown Airport, also known as "Holman Field", Minnesota

Elsewhere
The former name for Ulukhaktok, Northwest Territories, Canada
 Ulukhaktok/Holman Airport, Northwest Territories
 Holman's Bridge, in Aylesbury, Buckinghamshire, UK
 Holman Dome, a nunatak on David Island, Antarctica
 3666 Holman, a main-belt asteroid

Other uses
 Holman Brothers, a former mining equipment manufacture founded in 1801 based in Camborne, Cornwall, UK
 Holman Bible Publishers, publishers of the Holman Christian Standard Bible
 Holman Christian Standard Bible
 Holman Projector, an anti-aircraft weapon used by the Royal Navy during the Second World War
 Holman Preamplifier, produced by the Apt Corporation and named for Tomlinson Holman
 Holman's Regiment of Militia, reinforcements for the Continental Army during the American Revolutionary War
 Holman Rule, a legislative rule U.S. Congress allowing the pay of a federal government employee to be reduced; named for William S. Holman

See also
 Hollman, a surname
 Justice Holman (disambiguation)